The Black Diamond Hockey League (BDHL) is a semi-professional ice hockey league consisting of teams from the Western United States. Teams compete for the Joe Casey Cup, named in honor of the former Jackson Hole Moose team captain who died suddenly at the age of 37.

History 
The league was founded in 2014 with four member clubs: the Bozeman Stingers, Jackson Hole Moose, Park City Pioneers, and Sun Valley Suns. Teams played a 12-game schedule followed by a single-elimination playoff with the winner awarded the Joe Casey Cup.

In the first-ever league game, Jackson Hole shut out Park City 4-0. Jackson Hole upset regular season winner Sun Valley, who were a perfect 12-0, to capture the first league championship.

Season two in the BDHL saw the Park City Pioneers folding. The league replaced the team with the Missoula Desperados to remain at four teams.

The Sun Valley Suns avenged their championship loss by defeating Jackson Hole for the 2016 title.

Teams

Former teams 
 Missoula Desperados (2015–17)
 Park City Pioneers (2014–15) - returned in 2019
Vail Yeti (2017–18) - returned in 2019

Champions

Alumni 
Garnet Exelby (Sun Valley Suns) - Atlanta Thrashers, Toronto Maple Leafs
Christian Hanson (Sun Valley Suns) - Stavanger Oilers
 Evan MacIntosh (Park City Pioneers) - Oxford City Stars, Boro/Vetlanda HC, Lindefallets SK, Delaware Thunder 
 Ryan Widmar (Sun Valley Suns) - IFK Strömsund Hockey, Oxford City Stars, Antwerp Phantoms, HK Celje, Gladsaxe Bears, Poitiers Dragons
 Brian Gibbons (Park City Pioneers) - EHC Neuweid, Hanover Indians, EHC Preussen Berlin

See also
 List of ice hockey leagues
 Federal Prospects Hockey League
 Southern Professional Hockey League
 Great Lakes Hockey League
 Mountain West Hockey League

References

External links
Official website
Bozeman Stingers
Breckenridge Vipers
Jackson Hole Moose
Park City Pioneers
Sun Valley Suns
Texas Titans
Vail Yeti

Ice hockey leagues in the United States
Minor league ice hockey